Winiston Cristian Santos (born 30 October 1991), commonly known as Tom, is a Brazilian footballer who plays for Juventus-SP as a goalkeeper.

Club career
Born in Aracaju, Sergipe, Tom graduated from Portuguesa's youth categories, and was promoted to the first-team squad in 2011, acting initially as a backup to Wéverton, Lúcio and Bruno; he remained as a third-choice for the following year.

Tom made his first-team debut on 24 March 2013, starting in a 1–1 draw at Santacruzense for the Paulista Série A2 championship. However, he only appeared in a further more match during the winning campaign, and in the year's Brasileirão, he was again third-choice.

In 2014, Tom was promoted to second-choice goalkeeper, only behind Glédson; he made his professional debut on 9 February 2014, coming on in the 18th minute of a 4–0 home routing over Linense, as the latter suffered an injury.

On 23 November 2015 Tom was released.

Honours
Portuguesa
Campeonato Paulista Série A2: 2013

References

External links

1991 births
Living people
People from Aracaju
Brazilian footballers
Association football goalkeepers
Campeonato Brasileiro Série B players
Campeonato Brasileiro Série C players
Campeonato Brasileiro Série D players
Liga Portugal 2 players
Associação Portuguesa de Desportos players
Agremiação Sportiva Arapiraquense players
Nacional Futebol Clube players
Esporte Clube Rio Verde players
Real S.C. players
Central Sport Club players
Clube Atlético Juventus players
Brazilian expatriate footballers
Brazilian expatriate sportspeople in Portugal
Expatriate footballers in Portugal
Sportspeople from Sergipe